Killing for Company may refer to:

 Killing for Company: The Case of Dennis Nilsen, a book by Brian Masters
 Killing for Company (band), a Welsh rock group featuring the drummer Stuart Cable
 "Killing for Company", a song by Swans from The Great Annihilator